The relationship between incarceration and health, compared to research on other social effects of incarceration, has been a topic of research for a relatively short period of time. Most of the foundational research on this topic was conducted in the 25 years before 2015, and indicates that incarceration generally has negative effects on prisoners' mental health, but some positive effects on their physical health. In the United States, the negative health effects of incarceration contribute to racial disparities in health between white and black women.

Cardiovascular effects
Former prisoners have higher odds of hospitalization and death from cardiovascular disease, even after controlling for socioeconomic status and race.

Youth
The incarceration of juveniles often results in adverse mental health consequences, especially in adult facilities. Such incarceration is also related to worse health across the life course.

Menopause 
Support for women experiencing menopause in incarceration is outlined in the 2009 Kyiv Declaration on Women’s Health in Prison.

References

Imprisonment and detention
Health effects by subject